Aristotelis Karasalidis (born 3 May 1991) is a Greek professional footballer who plays as a centre-back for Super League 2 club Panserraikos.

Career
Karasalidis started his career το the youth teams of PAOK in 2008 also participating in Greece's U19 national team. He was signed a three-year contract with the senior team in 2010 but was later released before signing for Panserraikos in 2011.

Career statistics

References

External links

Myplayer.gr Profile

1991 births
Living people
Greek footballers
Greece youth international footballers
Super League Greece players
Super League Greece 2 players
PAOK FC players
Panserraikos F.C. players
Aris Thessaloniki F.C. players
Paniliakos F.C. players
Niki Volos F.C. players
Iraklis Thessaloniki F.C. players
Xanthi F.C. players
Atromitos F.C. players
Panetolikos F.C. players
Association football defenders
Footballers from Thessaloniki